Terence Trent D'Arby's Symphony or Damn* (*Exploring the Tension Inside the Sweetness) is the third studio album by Terence Trent D'Arby, released in 1993 through Columbia Records. This album marked something of a comeback after the disappointing performance of his previous album Neither Fish nor Flesh, and was generally well received by many critics, with Q magazine rating it five stars upon its release.

Composition
The album is heavier in sound than D'Arby's debut album, which was essentially a mix of pop, soul and gospel. However Symphony or Damn contains several guitar oriented songs, such as "Do You Love Me Like You Say?", "Castillian Blue", "Are You Happy?" and the out-and-out rocker "She Kissed Me". The latter is an up-tempo hard rock song, that features the line "she likes rap and metal really loud", alluding to the subject's love of hip hop and heavy metal music. However, "Castillian Blue" and "Are You Happy?" have a blues guitar sound, with the former sounding dark and brooding and the latter featuring a far more upbeat pop/soul/blues sound. The drum sound throughout most of the album is also of a heavy nature.

"Penelope Please" namechecks the Pretenders frontwoman Chrissie Hynde in the chorus: "You will still be home in time, to watch The Pops, featuring Chrissie Hynde".

Commercial success and single releases
The album peaked at number 4 on the UK Albums Chart and was boosted by four top 20 UK singles, "Do You Love Me Like You Say?", "Delicate", featuring Des'ree (both tracks peaked at number 14 on the UK Singles Chart), "She Kissed Me" (UK number 16) and "Let Her Down Easy" (UK number 18).

Two more tracks were released from the album but they were not as successful as the aforementioned tracks. "Turn the Page" failed to chart, while "Neon Messiah" was released as an EP in Japan only. This included a number of B-sides and is a widely sought-after collector's item.

Track listing
"Welcome to My Monasteryo" – 0:31
"She Kissed Me" – 3:39
"Do You Love Me Like You Say?" – 5:30
"Baby, Let Me Share My Love" – 3:56
"Delicate" (featuring Des'ree) – 4:16
"Neon Messiah" – 3:55
"Penelope Please" – 3:07
"Wet Your Lips" – 4:15
"Turn the Page" – 6:07
"Castilian Blue" – 5:15
"Tension Inside The Sweetness/Frankie & Johnny" – 3:29
"Are You Happy?" – 3:54
"Succumb to Me" – 5:14
"I Still Love You" – 2:15
"Seasons" – 5:37
"Let Her Down Easy" – 4:06

Personnel
Terence Trent D'Arby – vocals, acoustic & rhythm guitar, bass, keyboards, clavinet, drums, percussion, drum programming, backing vocals
Craig Porteils – engineer
Chester Kamen, Tommy Girvin, Tim Pierce, Aaron McClain – guitar
Leland Sklar, Kevin Wyatt, Tim Archibald, Neil Stubenhaus, Will McGregor – bass
Curt Bisquera, Harvey Mason – drums
Randy Kerber – electric piano
Greg Phillinganes – keyboards
Emilio Castillo, Brandon Fields, Dino Govoni, Donny McCaslin, Scott Gilman – tenor saxophone
Stephen "Doc" Kupka – baritone saxophone
Bob Bowlby – alto saxophone
Greg Adams, Lee Thornburg, Andy Gravish, Joe Giorgianni – trumpet
John Wheller – trombone
John Allmark – trumpet, flugelhorn
Peter Cirelli – baritone horn
Matthew Vaughan – keyboards, programming

Charts

References

External links
Sananda Maitreya's Official Site Includes a more detailed discography

1993 albums
Terence Trent D'Arby albums
Columbia Records albums